Dimitrios Nikas (born 30 August 1999) is a Greek professional footballer who plays as a goalkeeper for Olympiacos B.

References

1999 births
Living people
Super League Greece players
Panionios F.C. players
Association football goalkeepers
Footballers from Athens
Greek footballers
Olympiacos F.C. B players